Yosra Dhieb (born 31 August 1995) is a Tunisian weightlifter who competes in the +75 kg division. She won the African Championships in 2013 and placed third at the 2015 African Games and fourth at the 2016 Olympics.

References

1995 births
Living people
Tunisian female weightlifters
Olympic weightlifters of Tunisia
Weightlifters at the 2016 Summer Olympics
Place of birth missing (living people)
African Games bronze medalists for Tunisia
African Games medalists in weightlifting
Competitors at the 2015 African Games
21st-century Tunisian women